Hélio Castroneves (born Hélio Alves de Castro Neves; 10 May 1975) is a Brazilian auto racing driver. He competes full-time in the IndyCar Series, driving the No. 06 Dallara-Honda for Meyer Shank Racing. He is one of four drivers to have won the Indianapolis 500 four times: in 2001, 2002, 2009, and 2021, and was runner-up in the IndyCar Series drivers' championship in 2002, 2008, 2013, and 2014. Castroneves also competes in the IMSA SportsCar Championship. He is a three-time winner of the 24 Hours of Daytona, consecutively in 2021 with Wayne Taylor Racing and 2022 and 2023 with Meyer Shank, in addition to the overall 2020 IMSA championship with Team Penske.

Castroneves began competitive go-karting at age 10, before progressing to car racing, in the Formula Chevrolet Brazil, Formula 3 Sudamericana, the British Formula Three Championship, and Indy Lights. He entered Championship Auto Racing Teams (CART) in 1998 with Bettenhausen Racing and with Hogan Racing in 1999, achieving one second place each with both teams. Castroneves moved to Team Penske in place of Greg Moore for 2000 and 2001, winning three races in both years.

He debuted in the Indy Racing League (IRL) in 2001, competing in two races for Penske and winning the Indianapolis 500. Castroneves drove full time in the IRL from 2002, winning the Indy 500 for a second straight year and finishing runner-up to Sam Hornish Jr. in the championship. He finished third in 2003 and 2006 and was runner-up to Scott Dixon in 2008. During the 2009 season, he won the Indianapolis 500 for the third time, and was fourth three times over the next four seasons, before coming second to Dixon in 2013, and his Penske teammate Will Power in 2014. Castroneves achieved one further series win in 2017 before leaving full-time IndyCar racing to make his IMSA SportsCar Championship debut with Penske at the 2017 Petit Le Mans, paired with Ricky Taylor. He won one race and finished seventh in the 2018 Prototype standings and improved to third with five podiums in 2019. In 2020, he would win three races in a row and his first auto racing title.

One of the most popular drivers in IndyCar, his celebration of climbing the fencing beside the track after a victory, would earn him the nickname "Spider-Man". Castroneves has represented IndyCar in the International Race of Champions series, the Race of Champions event, and the Superstar Racing Experience. Among other media appearances, Castroneves won the fifth season of Dancing with the Stars with professional dancer Julianne Hough.

Early and personal life
Castroneves was born in São Paulo, Brazil on May 10, 1975, to automobile dealer Hélio Castro Neves and former school teacher Sandra Alves de Castro Neves. He has an elder sister, Katiucia, who is his business manager. He was educated in the São Paulo school system. In 2000, he changed his surname from Castro Neves to Castroneves to stop the media misidentifying him as "Helio Neves" or "Helio Castro". Castroneves has a daughter with his long-time partner Adriana Henao.

Karting career
From early 1981 to 1986, Castroneves observed his father's minor stock car team race on weekends by being sneaked into a car's trunk in racing overalls and helmet, allowing him into a circuit. At age seven, he was given a child-sized motorized car for frequent driving on the streets of his gated community and asked his father about a go-kart. On his 11th birthday, Castroneves received his first go-kart from race car driver Alfredo Guaraná Menezes, and began driving at a karting track in São Paulo. His mother disliked racing, urging him to focus on schooling and enrolling him in less dangerous sports, such as association football, judo, swimming, tennis, and volleyball. Castroneves played those sports infrequently before telling his mother he wanted to focus on racing. He was inspired by Ayrton Senna, a three-time Formula One world champion.

His father enrolled him in the Karting State Championships in São Paulo in early 1987. Castroneves won his first trophy mid-year by bettering himself, as his father sold his Rio de Janeiro property to establish and finance a karting team around his son. At age 13, he was taken off full-time schooling to learn more about karting from his father and team members. Castroneves' mother disapproved because she believed he could opt to stop karting and was fearful of him not having a backup career. Castroneves won the 1989 Brazilian National Go-Kart Championship at age 14. Around this time, he and his family began watching Championship Auto Racing Teams (CART) and Formula One racing on television. From October 1989 to March 1990, Castroneves did weightlifting and played tennis to improve his physique.

In 1990, he forfeited the Brazilian National Go-Kart Championship and flew to Italy to enter the Karting World Cup to acquaint himself with the more powerful and grippier European go-karts. A mix-up of his registration papers with the Confederação Brasileira de Automobilismo (English: Brazilian Autosport Confederation) and talks with the Commission Internationale de Karting in Switzerland prevented him from entering until a fellow karter sustained an arm injury. Castroneves finished the race 16th. He raced in the 1991 Karting World Cup in France without registration trouble, finishing 25th, and won more races in Brazil.

Junior car racing career
Aged 16 in late 1991, Castroneves progressed into car racing, competing in Formula Chevrolet Brazil, a series for finishing go-karters. His parents hired a trainer to help him lift weights for better car control and took him to a local recreational center. Negotiations to drive for the Arisco team fell through when it asked for $200,000 in sponsorship, causing his father to spend $250,000 on his team. Driving a Copral-Berta-Chevrolet car, Castroneves was championship runner-up with one victory and 92 points in the eight-round season. He moved to the higher-tier Formula 3 (F3) Sudamericana in 1993 driving a Ralt RT34-Mugen Honda car with Copral and later the funded Amir Nasr Racing Team. Castroneves' five-year-old car was worn and had no aerial to communicate to his team by radio. He was championship runner-up to Argentinean driver Fernando Croceri with four victories, eight podium finishes and 57 points.

Castroneves progressed to the Brazilian Formula Three Championship in 1994 with the Amir Nasr Racing Team, finishing second overall with three victories, four pole positions and 52 points from eight races. For 1995, Castroneves drove a Dallara F395-Mugen Honda car for Paul Stewart Racing in the British Formula Three Championship. His father obtained sponsorship from a Brazilian bank, and mid-way through 1995, sold his business assets, private company and Katicia's university apartment to help finance his son's career. Castroneves was third in the drivers' championship with 169 points, six podiums and a win at Donington Park. He finished third in the Masters of Formula 3 at Circuit Zandvoort and crashed out of the Macau Grand Prix.

In November 1995, a Philip Morris International executive asked Castroneves whether he wanted to enter a four-day Indy Lights (CART's developmental series) test session at Phoenix International Raceway's oval track against nine other drivers. Although he did not finish the test due to exhaustion, he signed to drive Tasman Motorsports' third car with partial funding from the team and the rest from a corporate sponsor after another year in F3 was financially unfeasible. Driving the  8 Lola T93/20-Buick car in the 1996 season, Castroneves won at Circuit Trois-Rivières and achieved seven top-tens for seventh overall with 84 points. A series of accidents and Castroneves' lack of English frustrated him, and he briefly spoke to a sports psychologist for help mid-season.

For the 1997 season, he remained at Tasman Motorsport, but was told his sponsor was leaving, forcing Katicia to promote him to several Brazilian companies. He and team owner Steve Horne agreed if he won five races, Horne would retain all prize monies until Castroneves paid him what he was owed, effectively driving for free. Driving the No. 29 Lola T97/20-Buick car, Castroneves was championship runner-up to teammate Tony Kanaan, winning three of the twelve races, six top tens, four pole positions, and 152 points. On June 11, 1997, the two-time Indianapolis 500 winner Emerson Fittipaldi became Castroneves' manager and sponsorship finder.

CART

1998–1999

In January 1998, Bettenhausen Racing owner Tony Bettenhausen Jr. invited him to test for his CART team at Sebring International Raceway; Castroneves signed to drive its No. 16 Reynard 98I-Mercedes-Benz car in the 1998 season, and was assigned former Penske Racing employee Tom Brown as his race engineer. During practice for the season-opening Grand Prix of Miami at Homestead–Miami Speedway, Castroneves sustained a sore head in an accident but medical officials cleared him to race. Castroneves achieved his first career top-ten finish in CART, a ninth at the Grand Prix of Long Beach, followed by a season-high second in the Miller 200 at Milwaukee Mile. He was 17th in the drivers' championship with 36 points, and was second to Kanaan in the Rookie of the Year standings.

In mid-1998 Chip Ganassi Racing (CGR) wanted Castroneves to replace the Formula One-bound Alex Zanardi; Team Rahal were also interested in him. Fittipaldi blocked both deals as he felt Mercedes-Benz was CART's best engine. Bettenhausen Racing fired Castroneves in January 1999, and replaced him with the sponsored Shigeaki Hattori. Castroneves agreed with team owner Carl Hogan on January 26 to drive for Hogan Racing in 1999 in place of JJ Lehto on the condition he paid $3 million in sponsorship to the team. He drove the unreliable No. 9 Lola B99/00-Mercedes-Benz car with an engine inconsistent in producing power. Castroneves was ninth in the Firestone Firehawk 500K at Twin Ring Motegi, before coming second in the Motorola 300 at Gateway International Raceway. In the Miller Lite 225 at Milwaukee, Castroneves achieved his first CART pole position. The rest of the season saw him achieve four more top-tens and finished 15th in the points standings with 48.

2000–2001
Post-season, Hogan closed his CART team because Fittipaldi was unable to provide him with the requested sponsorship money and consequently, stopped paying Castroneves a salary. Castroneves and his sister negotiated without Fittipaldi's help with Walker Racing to replace the outgoing Gil de Ferran and also Team Rahal without success. Following Greg Moore's death in an accident at the season-ending Marlboro 500 at California Speedway, Penske owner Roger Penske, team president Tim Cindric, attorneys, and sports agent Alan Miller hired Castroneves on a three-year contract for Castroneves after pressure from sponsor Marlboro to find a replacement driver by that date. Castroneves ended his working relationship with Fittipaldi soon after for career mismanagement.

For the 2000 season, Penske stopped building cars, switched to a Reynard 2KI, changed engine manufacturers from Mercedes-Benz to Honda, and tire supplier from Goodyear to Firestone in a bid to improve performance. Castroneves found the Honda engine's driveability different from Mercedes-Benz's, and was at first, not friends with his teammate de Ferran because they were competitors. He finished second at the Grand Prix of Long Beach, his only points finish in the first six races. He led the final 24 laps of the Grand Prix of Detroit in his first series victory after Juan Pablo Montoya retired with mechanical trouble. Castroneves won the Miller Lite 200 at Mid-Ohio Sports Car Course, took five top-tens, and a third victory in the Grand Prix of Monterey at Laguna Seca. He was seventh in the drivers' championship with 129 points, and was named the inaugural winner of the Greg Moore Legacy Award as "the driver who best typifies Moore's outstanding talent on the track as well as displaying a dynamic personality with the fans, media, and the CART community."

In 2001, he drove the No. 3 Reynard 01I-Honda, and journalist David Phillips considered him a championship contender. Castroneves changed his strategy on a race-by-race basis, getting support from de Ferran and his teammate's pit crew. At the season's second race, the Grand Prix of Long Beach, he led all 82 laps from pole position for his fourth career win. Castroneves started from pole position in the Firestone Firehawk 500 at Motegi, leading more laps than any other driver to finish second, and led every lap of the Grand Prix of Detroit for his second victory of 2001. He achieved a third win at the Miller Lite 200 to go one point behind championship leader Kenny Bräck, and overtook the latter after finishing seventh in the Motorola 220.  Castroneves lost the points lead after coming 18th in Indy Vancouver, but claimed three top sixes in the final six races to finish fourth in the drivers' standings with 141 points.

IndyCar Series

2001–2004

He debuted in the Indy Racing League (IRL) in 2001, driving Penske's No. 68 Dallara IR-01-Oldsmobile car, at the season-opening Pennzoil Copper World Indy 200 at Phoenix to understand the series before the Indianapolis 500. Castroneves started 17th but retired with engine failure after three-quarters race distance. He qualified 11th for his first Indianapolis 500 and led the final 52 laps to win the race at his first attempt.

Castroneves switched to the IRL from the 2002 season since Marlboro wanted Penske to focus on the American market. Penske changed engine manufacturers from Oldsmobile to Chevrolet for its Dallara IR-02 car. At Phoenix for the season's second race, he won from pole position after passing his teammate de Ferran on the 183rd lap. Castroneves' season highlight was the Indianapolis 500, which he won in controversial circumstances. With one-and-a-half laps remaining, CART driver Paul Tracy overtook Castroneves for the lead, just as the yellow caution flag light came on for a two-car accident between Buddy Lazier and Laurent Redon. IRL officials' rejected an appeal from Tracy's squad Team Green, upholding Castroneves' second successive Indianapolis 500 victory. He finished no lower than ninth in the next nine races, battling his teammate De Ferran and Panther Racing's Sam Hornish Jr. for the championship. Before the final round at Texas Motor Speedway Castroneves was 12 points behind Hornish and needed to win the race and for Hornish to finish third or lower to claim the championship. He finished second, 0.010 seconds behind Hornish, ending the season runner-up with 511 points.

Before the 2003 season, Penske allowed Castroneves to test for the Toyota Formula One team at Circuit Paul Ricard in France before possible contract renewal. He impressed Toyota with his performance but was told CART champion Cristiano da Matta signed as a race driver for 2003. Castroneves told Penske he would stay with the team, citing his fair and loyal treatment towards him. The beginning of the season saw Castroneves earn two top threes in Homestead-Miami, Phoenix, and the Indianapolis 500. Castroneves took two straight second places at Richmond International Raceway and Kansas Speedway and won at Gateway International Raceway and Nazareth Speedway to take the points to lead. A gearbox failure at Chicagoland Speedway leaving him 20th and a sixth in California meant he entered the season-ending Chevy 500 at Texas as one of five championship contenders and equal on points with CGR's Scott Dixon. A minor collision with Tony Kanaan took Castroneves out of title contention. He was third in points with 484 scored.

For the 2004 season, Hornish joined Castroneves at Penske after De Ferran retired from IndyCar; at first, the two did not speak to each other often because of their differing personalities. He led most of the season-opening Toyota Indy 300 before Hornish passed him on the final lap to win. Castroneves qualified eighth for his fourth Indianapolis 500. A lack of horsepower against the Honda-powered cars caused him to finish the rain-shortened race ninth. Two races later, Castroneves' first pole position of the season came in the SunTrust Indy Challenge at Richmond, where he finished third. He took eight more top tens, four pole positions, and overtook Andretti Green Racing's Dan Wheldon to lead the final 21 laps of the season-ending race at Texas for his only win of 2004. Castroneves' finished fourth in the drivers' championship with 440 points.

2005–2008 
Penske's performance in 2004 saw Castroneves being viewed as an outsider for the 2005 title. He began the season with a fifth place in the Toyota Indy 300 and a second at the following XM Satellite Radio 200. Starting the Indianapolis 500 from fifth position, Castroneves finished the race four places lower in ninth. At Richmond for the SunTrust Indy Challenge two races later, he qualified second and led a race-high 112 laps to win. The relationship between Castroneves and his teammate Hornish cooled after failed overtakes causing both drivers to collide. He qualified on the pole position at Pikes Peak International Raceway and Watkins Glen International and took six top-tens in the final ten races, finishing with 440 points for sixth in the drivers' championship.

Before the 2006 season, Penske changed engine manufacturers from the under-powered Toyota to the more powerful Honda in its Dallara IR-05 car after Toyota withdrew from IndyCar. Castroneves started fifth and led 40 laps for his first series road course win in the Grand Prix of St. Petersburg. He took a second successive victory at Motegi, leading 184 laps from pole position to lead Wheldon by 42 championship points entering the Indianapolis 500. After qualifying second, handling difficulties caused him to strike the turn four concrete barrier, leaving him 25th after 109 laps. Castroneves won the Bombardier LearJet 500 after strategic errors by his teammate Hornish and CGR before tire problems at Kansas and a sixth place at Kansas lost him the points lead to Hornish. A victory at Michigan International Speedway gave Castroneves a one-point lead over Hornish going into the final race in Chicago. A fourth-place put him third in points with 473.

For the 2007 season, Castroneves believed the competition would be stronger than in 2006. The relationship between him and Hornish became cordial and the two shared information. He began the year with four top nines, leading 95 laps from pole position to win the Grand Prix of St. Petersburg. He took his third career Indianapolis 500 pole position, finishing the rain-shortened race third after pre-race electrical and fueling problems. At the ABC Supply Company A.J. Foyt 225 at Milwaukee a week later, he took his third pole position of 2007, but a rear wing mounting failure on lap 201 caused him to crash while leading. Castroneves took six top-nines, and three more pole positions in the final ten races for sixth overall in points with 446.

Castroneves began the 2008 season by finishing no lower than fourth in the first four rounds with consecutive second places at St. Petersburg and Motegi to take the early points lead. He qualified fourth for the Indianapolis 500; Castroneves lost the points lead to Dixon when front wing damage relegated him to fourth. He finished second in both Texas and Richmond with consecutive pole positions at Nashville and Mid-Ohio, both of which did not result in a race victory. Castroneves won the Peak Antifreeze Indy Grand Prix at Infineon Raceway leading a race-high 51 laps from pole position to end a 29-race winless streak. After finishing second in Detroit for illegally blocking Justin Wilson, he entered the season-ending Peak Antifreeze Indy 300 30 points behind championship leader Dixon. Castroneves needed to win the race and for Dixon to finish 11th or lower to become the champion. He began in 28th due to a track limit penalty, beating Dixon by 0.0033 seconds in the second-closest finish in series history, ending the season second in points with 629.

Tax evasion trial
In late 2008, an Internal Revenue Service (IRS) jury charged Castroneves with conspiracy and six counts of tax evasion for failing to report $5.5 million of income from 1999 to 2004. The issue came about when Miller signed Castroneves' first contract with Penske following Moore's death due to pressure from sponsors to take Moore's seat. Miller negotiated the contract with Penske and removed all mentions of Moore with Castroneves' name. Castroneves, who had been investigated by the IRS since 2004 when it issued 150 subpoenas to businesses and individuals who did business with him, pleaded not guilty to the charges on October 3, and was ordered released on a $10 million bail. The IRS said he owed them $2.3 million in taxes.

During the trial, in which faced a maximum jail sentence of six-and-a-half years with subsequent deportation because he was a non-American citizen, and the loss of his contracts with companies he endorsed and Team Penske, his indictment centered around whether he used Seven Productions, a Panamanian shell corporation set up by his father to obscure taxable income and improve his son's image in Brazil. Prosecutors called that a lie, showing jurors documents claiming Castroneves owned Seven Productions. An IRS agent testified Castroneves owed every amount of taxable income despite the driver not receiving any of it. The defense argued Castroneves focused on racing rather than his income; he was unaware of his finances and disliked Dutch and Panamanian business dealings. They said he was uninterested and could not understand his finances and signed papers without knowing their meaning.

The trial ended with closing arguments on 10 April 2009. The jury deliberated until 17 April, when it acquitted Castroneves of the six counts of tax evasion but hung on the conspiracy charge. On 22 May, prosecutors dropped the remaining conspiracy charge.

2009–2013

Castroneves signed a multi-year contract with Penske from the 2009 season; Will Power replaced him for the season-opening St. Petersburg race before Castroneves returned for the Grand Prix of Long Beach. Castroneves' season highlight was the Indianapolis 500, where he qualified fastest, and led twice for a total of 66 laps for his third victory there. In the Bombardier Learjet 550 at Texas two races later, Castroneves achieved his second victory of 2009. He took six more top-tens, including a second place in the Edmonton Indy, and pole position in the Iowa Corn Indy 250 at Iowa Speedway. Castroneves was eliminated from championship contention at Chicago, and finished fourth overall with 433 points.

For the 2010 season, he felt Penske had reached the potential of its ageing Dallara-Honda car, and feared other teams would exploit this to close the performance gap. Castroneves won the inaugural Indy Grand Prix of Alabama to extend his record of winning a race to ten straight seasons. After qualifying on pole position for the Indianapolis 500, a stall in a pit stop relegated him to ninth. Five races later, at the Honda Indy Edmonton, Castroneves was the first to finish, but was demoted to tenth after he was deemed to have blocked his teammate Power. He won two consecutive races, at Kentucky Speedway and Motegi, before ending the season with a fifth at Homestead-Miami. With 531 points, Castroneves was fourth in the drivers' standings.

The beginning of the 2011 season saw him struggle in comparison with his previous years at Penske. Castroneves finished poorly as a result of three collisions in the first four races in St. Petersburg, Long Beach and São Paulo; his best result in that period was a seventh at Birmingham, putting him 17th overall by the time of the Indianapolis 500 in May. Castroneves qualified 16th for the race; a flat tire and vibration left him one lap down in 17th. The rest of Castroneves' season included two-second places at Edmonton and Sonoma, and three top-nines. He was 11th overall with 312 points, his lowest finish since he was sixth in both 2005 and 2007. The 2011 season was the first since 1999 in which Castroneves did not achieve a race win.

He signed a contract extension with Penske prior to the 2012 season. At the season-opening Grand Prix of St. Petersburg, Castroneves passed J. R. Hildebrand with 26 laps to go to win. He took pole position for the following Indy Grand Prix of Alabama and finished third. In the Indianapolis 500, Castroneves qualified sixth, but finished tenth due to his car lacking downforce. He then took three sixth places at Milwaukee, Iowa and Toronto. and won the Edmonton Indy to draw within 23 points of championship leader Ryan Hunter-Reay. Castroneves ended the season with three more top-tens for fourth overall with 431 points.

Castroneves resigned with Penske for the 2013 season; the team modified his car in the off-season. Two podiums in the season-opening Grand Prix of St. Petersburg and the following Honda Indy Grand Prix of Alabama gave him the points lead. Castroneves fell to third after finishing 13th in the São Paulo Indy 300, He qualified eighth for the Indianapolis 500; rev limiter issues left him in sixth. In the Firestone 550 at Texas, Castroneves led the final 132 laps to win, breaking a tie with Marco Andretti for the points lead. Castroneves took two more second places at Milwaukee and the second Toronto race and finished no lower than ninth in the next eight races. An opportunity for him to win the championship before the season was over came to nothing when gearbox problems in the Grand Prix of Houston double leader dropped 25 points behind Dixon. To win the championship in the season-ending MAVTV 500 IndyCar World Championships, Castroneves needed to finish nine positions higher than Dixon. A sixth place for Castroneves and a fifth for Dixon gave Castroneves second overall with 550 points.

2014–2017

He remained with Penske for the 2014 season. Castrovenes finished third at the season-opening Grand Prix of St. Petersburg and the Grand Prix of Indianapolis three races later. He qualified fourth for the Indianapolis 500, and finished second, 0.0600 seconds behind Hunter-Reay in the second-closest finish in event history after a late race duel for the victory. He took pole position for the first Detroit Belle Isle Grand Prix race and won the second. After three straight sub-par results, Castroneves finished second in the Pocono IndyCar 500 at Pocono Raceway to tie his teammate Will Power for the points lead, which took after finishing eighth in the Iowa Corn Indy 300. He relinquished the points lead after a throttle problem left him 19th in the Honda Indy 200 at Mid-Ohio. Entering the final race, the MAVTV 500 IndyCar World Championships, Castroneves was 51 points behind Power. After winning the one point for the pole position, he had to claim victory and for Power to finish seventh or lower to become the champion. Castroneves placed 14th for second overall with 609 points.

For the 2015 season, his Penske car was fitted with Chevrolet's updated aerodynamic package. Castroneves achieved consecutive second places in the Indy Grand Prix of Louisiana and the Grand Prix of Long Beach and two pole positions. During practice for the Indianapolis 500, he lost control of his car in the first turn, and struck the barrier, flipping his car over 180 degrees and landing upside down. He started fifth and ran consistently within the top five but finished seventh. The rest of the season saw Castroneves achieve consecutive third places in the Firestone 600 and the Honda Indy Toronto and was second in the ABC Supply Wisconsin 250 along with two more pole positions for fourth overall with 453 points.

Castroneves stayed with Penske for the 2016 season. At the Grand Prix of Long Beach, he led a race-high 47 laps from pole position but a strategy error left him third. Castroneves took another podium finish two races later, a second place at the Grand Prix of Indianapolis. After qualifying ninth for the Indianapolis 500, he led 24 laps, finishing 11th after a lap-160 collision with Hildebrand dislodged Castroneves' left-rear bumper pod. Castroneves achieved two more podium finishes, a second in the Honda Indy Toronto, and a third in the IndyCar Grand Prix at the Glen. In the ABC Supply 500 at Pocono, the top of his vehicle was mounted by Alexander Rossi's airborne car after Rossi and Charlie Kimball collided in the pit lane. Castroneves was uninjured from the impact. With 504 points, Castroneves was fourth in the drivers' championship.

He remained at Penske for the 2017 season. Castrovenes began with his third successive pole position at the Grand Prix of Long Beach; electrical problems left him ninth. He led the first 73 laps of the Desert Diamond West Valley Phoenix Grand Prix for fourth after winning pole. Castroneves began from a career-low 19th in the Indianapolis 500, moving through the field to finish second after a late race duel for the win with Takuma Sato. He earned his 50th pole position in the Kohler Grand Prix at Road America, and went on to lead 214 laps in his first victory in 54 races in the Iowa Corn 300. Castroneves finished no lower than eighth in the next five races, and entered the season's final race, the Grand Prix of Sonoma 22 points behind championship leader and teammate Josef Newgarden and 19 behind Dixon. A victory and Newgarden finishing third or lower and Dixon second or worse would give Castroneves the title. He finished in fifth place to be fourth overall with 598 points.

2018–present 

Post-season, he stepped down from IndyCar full-time to move to Penske's IMSA SportsCar Championship program. Castroneves was entered into both the IndyCar Grand Prix and the Indianapolis 500 as part of his 2018 campaign; he prepared for the races by sharing notes with his teammates and familiarizing himself with the car. Castroneves' team employed a strategy allowing him to finish sixth in the IndyCar Grand Prix. At the Indianapolis 500, he started from eighth place, before losing control of his car in turn four and crashing on the 146th lap for a 27th-place finish. In the 2019 season, he again entered both the IndyCar Grand Prix and the Indianapolis 500. Castroneves finished the IndyCar Grand Prix two laps behind the leaders in 21st. He started 12th in the Indianapolis 500, finishing the race 18th following a pit lane collision with the rear of James Davison's car earning him a drive-through penalty. He began the 2020 Indianapolis 500 from 27th and finished the race in 11th.

Castroneves signed to race for Arrow McLaren SP in place of the unfit Oliver Askew at the Harvest Grand Prix in his first IndyCar start for a team other than Penske since 1999. He finished 20th in the first race and 21st in the second. Following an approach by team owner Michael Shank in late 2020, Castroneves signed for the small Meyer Shank Racing (MSR) team to compete at six races in the 2021 season, feeling the growing team would give him the opportunity to win a fourth Indianapolis 500. He had asked MSR to enter him in more races but the request was denied. At the Indianapolis 500, Castroneves achieved his record-tying fourth career victory in the event after a late-race pass on Álex Palou. He went on to score one more top ten finish at Nashville in his final five races of 2021 to finish 22nd overall with 158 points.

In July 2021 he signed a contract extension with MSR to drive for the whole of the 2022 season - his first full-time season for five years. Castroneves achieved a season-best result of seventh at the Indianapolis 500 and scored two other top-ten finishes at Long Beach and Mid-Ohio in placing 18th overall with 263 points accumulated. In August 2022, he signed a one-year contract extension to remain at MSR for the 2023 championship.

Sports car career

Castroneves made his endurance racing debut in the 2006 Mil Milhas Brasil, winning after 374 laps in a shared GTP1-class Aston Martin DBR9 with Nelson Piquet, Nelson Piquet Jr., and Christophe Bouchut. He entered at the 2007 24 Hours of Daytona (part of the Rolex Sports Car Series), sharing Michael Shank Racing's No. 60 Riley Daytona Prototype (DP) car with Hornish, Oswaldo Negri Jr. and Mark Patterson and finishing ninth. Two months later, Castroneves drove the No. 7 Penske Porsche RS Spyder Evo car with Timo Bernhard and Romain Dumas in the Le Mans Prototype 2 (LMP2) category of the 12 Hours of Sebring (part of the American Le Mans Series), finishing third in class and fifth overall. He returned to the Rolex Sports Car Series to share the No. 9 Penske-Taylor Racing Riley DP car with Ryan Briscoe and Kurt Busch in the 2008 24 Hours of Daytona. finishing 13th after starting third. For the 2008 Petit Le Mans and the following 2008 Monterey Sports Car Championships Castroneves shared Penske's No. 5 Porsche RS Spyder Evo car with Briscoe, winning the LMP2 category at Petit Le Mans.

In 2016, Roger Penske asked Castroneves if he wanted a full time sports car career. Although Castroneves wanted to remain in IndyCar, he solicited advice from Indianapolis 500 winner Rick Mears because he had doubts about staying at Penske. Mears told Castroneves to remain at Penske because of Roger Penske's personality. Talks with several teams came close to employment but Castroneves decided to remain with Penske out of loyalty. To prepare for the 2018 WeatherTech Sports Car Championship in a Acura ARX-05 car in the Daytona Prototype International (DPi) category, he drove the final race of the 2017 season, the Petit Le Mans. Teamed with Montoya and Simon Pagenaud, he qualified the No. 6 Oreca 07-Gibson LMP2 car on pole position, finishing the race third after a collision with Matteo Cressoni's Ferrari.

He formally joined Penske's 2018 IMSA program in October 2017. Castroneves was joined by Ricky Taylor for the entire season, and by Graham Rahal for the 24 Hours of Daytona, the 12 Hours of Sebring and Petit Le Mans. He referenced his teammates Dane Cameron and Montoya, and communicated constantly with his race engineer and Taylor. Their car started second for the Daytona race, and finished ninth, after Castroneves and Action Express Racing's Felipe Nasr collided in the 16th hour. After starting third at Sebring, he retired after six hours with a loss of oil pressure. In the Acura Sports Car Challenge at Mid-Ohio he and Taylor led 87 laps from pole for his first series victory. The final six races saw him achieve four top tens and finish second in the Chevrolet Sports Car Classic at Detroit. Castroneves was seventh in the Prototype drivers' standings with 243 points and was third in the North American Endurance Cup.

For the 2019 season, he remained at Penske in the new DPi class. He again partnered Taylor in the No. 7 car, joined by Rossi at the 24 Hours of Daytona and 12 Hours of Sebring and Rahal in the season-ending Petit Le Mans. Castroneves and his co-drivers finished the rain-shortened Daytona season-opener third from starting second. A fourth place at Sebring and a second in the following BUBBA Burger Sports Car Grand Prix at Long Beach moved him and Taylor to a season-high second in the DPi standings. The rest of the season saw Castroneves and Taylor achieve two third places in the Chevrolet Sports Car Classic and the Petit Le Mans and a second place in the Monterey Grand Prix at Laguna Seca. With 284 points, he finished third in the DPi standings and was joint fifth with Oliver Jarvis and Tristan Nunez of Mazda Team Joest in the North American Endurance Cup.

Castroneves remained at Penske's IMSA program in 2020. He was again teamed with Taylor in the No. 7 vehicle, with Rossi joining them for the endurance races. Castroneves' team was comprised in the fourth hour of the season-opening 24 Hours of Daytona following a collision with Harry Tincknell restricting them to finishing 22 laps down in eighth. He won consecutive races in the rain-affected Road Race Showcase at Road America from pole position, the Grand Prix of Road Atlanta, and the Sports Car Challenge at Mid-Ohio. Castroneves and Taylor won the championship at the season-ending 12 Hours of Sebring, his first in auto racing, by one point over Briscoe and Renger van der Zande.

In the 2021 IMSA SportsCar Championship, he won the 2021 24 Hours of Daytona as an endurance driver, sharing the No. 10 Wayne Taylor Racing Acura ARX-05 car with Filipe Albuquerque, Rossi and Taylor. Castroneves replaced Olivier Pla in the No. 60 MSR Acura ARX-05 DPi car he shared with Montoya and Cameron at the season-ending Petit Le Mans. He shared MSR's No. 60 Acura ARX-05 entry for the Endurance Cup races of the 2022 IMSA season alongside full-season racers Tom Blomqvist and Jarvis. Castroneves fended off Taylor in the final laps of the 2022 24 Hours of Daytona to win the event for the second year in succession. Although he was set to enter both the 12 Hours of Sebring and the IndyCar round at Texas that were held on the same weekend, he later withdrew from the Sebring race due to logistical complications and he was replaced by Stoffel Vandoorne. Castroneves went on to win the season-ending Petit Le Mans alongside Blomqvist and Jarvis.

At the 2023 24 Hours of Daytona, Castroneves achieved his third consecutive victory in the race, sharing the No. 60 MSR Acura ARX-06 LMDh entry with Blomqvist, Colin Braun and Pagenaud as an endurance driver in the GTP category.

Other racing ventures

Castroneves was invited to compete in the International Race of Champions in 2002, 2003, 2004, and 2005. Driving a Pontiac Firebird Trans Am, his best in the series was eighth with two podium finishes in 2002. In the 2010 V8 Supercar Championship Series, Castroneves joined James Rosenberg Racing in its No. 47 Ford FG Falcon as Tim Slade's international co-driver for the Gold Coast 600 double header. He visited the team's factory for a seat fitting as preparation. Castroneves and Slade finished outside the top ten in both races. The following year, he again joined Slade at James Rosenberg at the Gold Coast 600 race of the 2011 International V8 Supercars Championship. The duo finished the first race 12th and 10th in the second.

In late 2012, Castroneves joined Shell Racing in the season-ending Stock Car Brasil race, the Stock Car Corrida do Milhão, after a sponsor invited him to enter with Roger Penske's support. He placed 14th in a Peugeot 408. Castroneves was signed as a guest driver for Shell Racing in the seventh round of the 2013 Stock Car Brasil at Ribeirão Preto Street Circuit; doctors ordered his withdrawal due to sustaining bruised ribs, neck sprain and a deep shin cut in a practice accident. 

In the 2017 off-season, he paired with Gabriel Glusman at the Latin America team in the 2017 Race of Champions Nations Cup, being eliminated at the group stages. He returned with the same team for the 2018 Race of Champions Nations Cup, this time with Montoya, finishing runner-up to Team Germany's Bernhard and René Rast. At the 2019 Race of Champions, Castroneves joined Formula E champion Lucas di Grassi at Team Brazil, being knocked out of the semi-finals of the Nations Cup by Team Germany's Mick Schumacher and Sebastian Vettel. He competed in the Superstar Racing Experience in 2021, finishing fifth in the points standings with six top-ten finishes.

For the 2022 Race of Champions, Castroneves competed in the individual competition and for Team Latin America in the Nations Cup alongside rally driver Benito Guerra Jr. He was eliminated in the first round of both events.

Media appearances
Castroneves was encouraged by Apolo Ohno, an Olympic speed skater, to participate on dance program Dancing with the Stars in 2007. He was accepted onto its fifth season by the casting director and producers, who watched a video of him and his teammate's Hornish driving styles in different locations. He was paired with professional dancer Julianne Hough, with whom he built a rapport due to their similar personalities. He prepared by watching episodes of the fourth season and instruction videos. The couple lasted until the finals, which they won with a higher percentage of the public vote than singer Mel B. When he won Dancing with the Stars Castroneves appeared on The Oprah Winfrey Show in February 2008. From 2007 to 2010, he was a correspondent on Dancing with the Stars for Entertainment Tonight.

In 2010, he collaborated with writer Marissa Matteo on his autobiography, Victory Road: The Ride of My Life. Castroneves was inspired to write the book to convey his negative emotions in his tax evasion trial and how he dealt with them. He was selected to be a judge on Miss Universe 2011, a beauty pageant held that September in São Paulo. In 2012 Castroneves appeared on Dancing with the Stars 15th season and was partnered with Chelsie Hightower. The couple were eliminated in the competition's third week. Castroneves appeared on the December 17, 2012 edition of The Jeff Probst Show, and featured on an episode of Celebrity Wife Swap's third season in 2014. In 2016, he was chosen to take part on American Ninja Warrior, and teamed up with IndyCar drivers Conor Daly, James Hinchcliffe, Tony Kanaan and Will Power on Celebrity Family Feud that same year.

Public image and other interests

Castroneves is one of IndyCar's most popular drivers; Dave Caldwell of The New York Times noted Castroneves' personality transcends IndyCar through his achievements and media attention outside it. J.J. O'Malley of Auto Racing Digest wrote that Castroneves received some coverage for "his charisma and personality", adding, "The driver seems to permanently wear a smile, and he's not afraid to show his emotions." After 2007, he became more recognized for winning Dancing with the Stars than his sporting achievements. A merchandise sales tallying company attributed Castroneves' popularity outside racing for increasing IndyCar attendances by 68 percent in 2008. Of his IndyCar Series legacy, NBC Sports' Tony DiZinno said, "With four championship runners-up in 2002, 2008, 2013 and 2014, Castroneves is your equivalent Dan Marino, Buffalo Bills or Mark Martin of IndyCar. He'll forever be acknowledged as one of the best, but perhaps known more as the driver who never quite won a title".

After winning a race, Castroneves celebrated by stopping his car, and climbing the catchfence to send a message of delight in achieving success. He began the tradition with his first CART victory in Detroit in 2000 and repeated it each time he won a race. After this celebration, John Kernan, host of RPM 2Night, first gave Castroneves the nickname "Spider-Man", and has been mimicked by other drivers in the following years. His photogenic looks have been picked up the press, Including People, ESPN The Magazine, and Cosmopolitan. Castroneves has done business with oil companies Pennzoil, Shell, and electronics company SMS Audio. In December 2004, he had an audience with Pope John Paul II and spoke to a congress on how Catholicism impacted his life and racing career. Castroneves was part of the National Motorsports Coalition that spoke about spectators returning to race tracks and his season to the Congressional Motorsports Caucus in June 2021. He won the 2001 Indianapolis 500 Rookie of the Year and the 2004 Scott Brayton Award for "displaying the character that best exemplifies the racing spirit of the late Scott Brayton." Castroneves was inducted into the Indy Lights Hall of Fame in 2014 as a 1997 graduate, the Long Beach Motorsports Walk of Fame and the Texas Motorsports Hall of Fame in 2018, the Team Penske Hall of Fame in December 2020, and the Motorsports Hall of Fame of America as part of the class of 2022.

Motorsports career results

American open–wheel racing results
(key) (Races in bold indicate pole position) (small number denotes finishing position)

Indy Lights

CART results
(key) (Races in bold indicate pole position) (small number denotes finishing position)

IndyCar Series
(key) (Races in bold''' indicate pole position) (small number denotes finishing position)

* Season still in progress.
 1 Run on same day''
 2 The 2011 IZOD IndyCar World Championship was abandoned after Dan Wheldon died from injuries sustained in a 15-car crash on lap 11.

Indianapolis 500

Touring/Sports Cars

Complete American Le Mans Series results

V8 Supercar results

+ Not Eligible for points

Complete Stock Car Brasil results

† Ineligible for championship points.

IMSA SportsCar Championship

International Race of Champions
(key) (Bold – Pole position. * – Most laps led.)

Superstar Racing Experience
(key) * – Most laps led. 1 – Heat 1 winner. 2 – Heat 2 winner.

 Season still in progress

Bibliography

Notes

References

External links

 
 
 IndyCar Driver Page

1975 births
American Le Mans Series drivers
Brazilian expatriate sportspeople in the United Kingdom
Brazilian expatriate sportspeople in the United States
British Formula Three Championship drivers
Brazilian racing drivers
Brazilian Champ Car drivers
Dancing with the Stars (American TV series) winners
Indianapolis 500 drivers
Indianapolis 500 Rookies of the Year
Indianapolis 500 polesitters
Indianapolis 500 winners
Indy Lights drivers
Brazilian IndyCar Series drivers
International Race of Champions drivers
Living people
Participants in American reality television series
Racing drivers from São Paulo
Supercars Championship drivers
Stock Car Brasil drivers
Brazilian WeatherTech SportsCar Championship drivers
24 Hours of Daytona drivers
12 Hours of Sebring drivers
American Ninja Warrior contestants
Paul Stewart Racing drivers
Tasman Motorsports drivers
Bettenhausen Racing drivers
Hogan Racing drivers
Team Penske drivers
Arrow McLaren SP drivers
Meyer Shank Racing drivers
Porsche Motorsports drivers
Wayne Taylor Racing drivers